Joseph Edward Abercrombie (born December 31, 1974) is a British fantasy writer and film editor. He is the author of The First Law trilogy, as well as other fantasy books in the same setting and a trilogy of young adult novels. His novel Half a King won the 2015 Locus Award for best young adult book.

Life and education 
Abercrombie was born in Lancaster, Lancashire, England. He was educated at Lancaster Royal Grammar School and Manchester University, where he studied psychology. He has a wife, Lou.

Abercrombie has been an avid player of video games since his childhood. In an interview with Edge magazine, Abercrombie stated that video games have been a big influence on his writing, including early interest in text-based adventure games and historically based strategy games such as Civilization and Age of Empires. Other favorite games of Abercrombie's include Elite, Dungeon Master, Street Fighter II, and Red Dead Redemption.

Career 
Abercrombie had a job making tea at a television production company before taking up a career as a freelance film editor. As a freelance film editor, Abercrombie found himself with more free time than he previously had. With this time, he decided to reconsider a story plot he conceived while attending University.

Abercrombie began writing The Blade Itself in 2002, completing it in 2004. It took a year of rejection by publishing agencies before Gillian Redfearn of Gollancz accepted the book for a five-figure deal in 2005 ("a seven-figure deal if you count the pence columns"). It was published by Gollancz in 2006 and was followed in the succeeding two years by two other books in the trilogy, by the titles of Before They Are Hanged and Last Argument of Kings, respectively. In 2008, Joe Abercrombie was a finalist for the John W. Campbell award for Best New Writer. That same year Abercrombie was one of the contributors to the BBC Worlds of Fantasy series, alongside other contributors such as Michael Moorcock, Terry Pratchett and China Miéville. In 2009, Abercrombie released the novel Best Served Cold.  It is set in the same world as The First Law Trilogy but is a stand-alone novel.  He followed with The Heroes (2011) and Red Country (2012), both again set in the world of the First Law Trilogy. The three standalone novels were later collected into an omnibus edition under the name The Great Leveller.

In 2011, Abercrombie signed a deal with Gollancz for four more books set in the First Law world. In 2013, HarperCollins' fantasy and children's imprints acquired the rights to three books by Abercrombie, aimed at younger readers. The three standalone but interconnected novels were released as the Viking-influenced Shattered Sea trilogy.

Bibliography

The First Law

The Age of Madness trilogy is set in the same fictional world as the First Law books during an industrial revolution.

Short fiction

All short fiction is collected in Sharp Ends: Stories from the World of the First Law (April 2016). There are a total of 13 stories, of which five were original to the collection and eight previously published. 

"Tough Times All Over" won a Locus Award, and "The Fool Jobs" and "Some Desperado" received nominations.

Shattered Sea trilogy

Selected awards and honours

Explanatory notes

References

External links
 
 

1974 births
British fantasy writers
English male novelists
Living people
People educated at Lancaster Royal Grammar School
People from Lancaster, Lancashire
Writers from Lancashire